The 1894 California Golden Bears football team was an American football team that represented the University of California, Berkeley during the 1894 college football season. The team competed as an independent under head coach Charles O. Gill and compiled a record of 0–1–2.

Schedule

References

California
California Golden Bears football seasons
College football winless seasons
California Golden Bears football